Brian Kendall (20 March 1947 – 1 May 1998) was a New Zealand boxer.

Biography
Born in Christchurch, New Zealand in 1947, Kendall began boxing as a nine-year-old at the Linwood Boys' Club.

He won the bronze medal in the men's 51–54 kg (bantamweight) division at the 1966 British Empire and Commonwealth Games, and competed in the 54–57 kg (featherweight) division at the 1970 British Commonwealth Games.

Kendall won seven consecutive national boxing titles in four different weight divisions from 1963 to 1969. He won the Jameson Belt for most scientific boxer at the 1965 and 1966 national championships. His career record was 97 wins from 108 bouts.

Kendall died from cancer in Brisbane, Australia, in 1998.

References

1947 births
1998 deaths
Boxers from Christchurch
Boxers at the 1966 British Empire and Commonwealth Games
Boxers at the 1970 British Commonwealth Games
Commonwealth Games bronze medallists for New Zealand
New Zealand male boxers
Commonwealth Games medallists in boxing
Bantamweight boxers
Medallists at the 1966 British Empire and Commonwealth Games